Charles Emmanuel of Savoy, 6th Prince of Carignano (24 October 1770 – 16 August 1800) was a Prince of Savoy and later the Prince of Carignano between 1780 and 1800, and the paternal grandfather of Vittorio Emanuele II, the first king of a united Italy.

Biography

He was a son of Victor Amadeus II, Prince of Carignano and Joséphine of Lorraine, and a fifth-generation descendant of Thomas Francis, Prince of Carignano, founder of the Carignano line of the House of Savoy.

On 24 October 1797 he married in Turin Maria Christina of Saxony, daughter of Carl Christian Joseph of Saxony, Duke of Courland, himself son of Augustus III of Poland. They had two children.

Charles Emmanuel died three years after his marriage in a French prison. He had fought against the French in the First Coalition War, but had made peace with the Republicans after the abdication of Charles Emmanuel IV of Sardinia. Soon after he became a suspect and was imprisoned in the Citadel of Turin. From there he was moved to Dijon and then to Chaillot in Paris, where he died. He was buried at the Basilica of Superga.

Issue

Prince Charles Albert of Savoy (1798–1849), Prince of Carignano, and King of Sardinia, married Archduchess Maria Theresa of Austria and had issue;
Princess Elisabeth of Savoy (1800–1856), married Archduke Rainer of Austria and had issue.

Ancestry

External links
Biography 

1770 births
1800 deaths
Nobility from Turin
Princes of Carignan
Burials at the Basilica of Superga